Gullele (Amharic: ጉለሌ ክፍለ ከተማ), also spelled Gulele, is a district of Addis Ababa, Ethiopia. As of 2011 its population was of 248,865.

Geography
The district is located in northern suburb of the city, near the Mount Entoto and Entoto Natural Park. It borders with the districts of Kolfe Keranio, Addis Ketema, Arada and Yeka.

List of places
 Gullele Bota

See also
Yekatit 12 Square

References

External links

Districts of Addis Ababa